Kregarjevo is a settlement on the right bank of the Kamnik Bistrica River in the Municipality of Kamnik in the Upper Carniola region of Slovenia.

References

External links
Kregarjevo on Geopedia

Populated places in the Municipality of Kamnik